Nasir Frederick Graham (born November 23, 1991), better known by his stage name Driicky Graham, is an American rapper from Newark, New Jersey. He was previously signed to E1, but he is now independent.

Early life 
Driicky Graham was born Nasir Frederick Graham in UMDNJ hospital. He is the son of Derrick "The Sharpshooter" Graham, a former light middleweight boxing champion, and Joylette Bullock, an educator. Graham and his family grew up in Newark, New Jersey. His parents separated when he was two. At the age of seven, he moved with his mother to Oxford, North Carolina. In 1994, at the age of three, Graham appeared in the music video to the Lords of the Underground single "Tic Toc". This was his first experience in the industry which later inspired him to jump start his career in hip hop music.

Music career
Graham began rapping at the age of 14, while always passionate about his craft, he did not view it as a serious career option until he signed to the independent record label Nu World Era Music Group when he turned 18. After building up a strong online following, Graham achieved commercial success in 2012 with his single "Snapbacks & Tattoos", which received airplay on radio stations. Following the success of "Snapbacks & Tattoos", many major record labels attempted to sign Graham, including Epic and Interscope: however, Graham instead decided to sign to independent label E1 Music His first mixtape, Ya Gotta Start Somewhere, was released on June 26, 2012. Graham also made an appearance on a BET Cypher during the 2012 BET Hip Hop Awards in October alongside ASAP Rocky, Angel Haze, Childish Gambino and Joey Badass His second mixtape, "The Experience Of Fred Neech" or "EFN" was released December 15, 2014.

Discography

Albums

Studio albums

Mixtapes

Singles

References 

Living people
1991 births
African-American male rappers
People from Oxford, North Carolina
Southern hip hop musicians
MNRK Music Group artists
Rappers from Newark, New Jersey
Rappers from North Carolina
21st-century American rappers
21st-century American male musicians
21st-century African-American musicians